Eddy Sáenz (born 5 July 1970) is a Nicaraguan former professional boxer who competed from 1993 to 2002. As an amateur, he competed in the men's featherweight event at the 1992 Summer Olympics. Sáenz also represented Nicaragua at the 1991 Pan American Games.

References

External links
 
 

1970 births
Living people
Nicaraguan male boxers
Olympic boxers of Nicaragua
Boxers at the 1992 Summer Olympics
Pan American Games competitors for Nicaragua
Boxers at the 1991 Pan American Games
Place of birth missing (living people)
Featherweight boxers